Murder Most Fab (2007) is the debut novel of comedian Julian Clary.

Synopsis
Still haunted by memories of his mentally ill mother and a doomed romance with a man called Timothy, rent boy Johnny Debonair moves on in the world when he breaks into the entertainment industry, eventually becoming 'Mr. Friday Night'. However, his path to fame is littered with corpses.

Told in the style of a final confession, the story follows Debonair as he finds himself drawn towards serial murder so he can maintain his hold on the spotlight.

Reviewed by Penguin Australia as "A darkly hilarious debut novel from one of Britain's best-loved entertainers"  the tale is told through the protagonist's interactions with his mother, an eccentric country girl his best friend and business partner and a past lover.

Author 
Julian Clary is a comedian, entertainer and novelist, who has toured across the world with his one-man shows. He became a household name in the late 1980s, and remains one of the country’s most popular (and least predictable) entertainers. Julian has appeared on numerous popular TV shows including Celebrity Big Brother (which he won), Strictly Come Dancing, This Morning, QI, Have I Got News For You and is a regular panellist on BBC Radio 4’s Just a Minute. He has starred in West End productions of Taboo and Cabaret, and appears in panto most years – he loves wearing silly clothes and lots of make up! Julian also narrates the Little Princess children’s television series. He lives in London with his husband.

Bibliographic Information

References

British crime novels
2007 British novels
2007 debut novels
Ebury Publishing books